The  Textile Growth Programme is a programme in the United Kingdom funded by the European Union Regional Development Fund,  designed to support and create jobs in the textile industry through grant aid.

Recipients
 2016 English Fine Cotton Tower Mill, Dukinfield

References

European Union and agriculture
Textile industry of the United Kingdom